Go! Discs was a London-based record label, launched in 1983 from offices in Wendell Road, Shepherd's Bush, by Andy Macdonald and Lesley Symons. The pair founded the label after Macdonald left his job as press officer at Stiff Records, and Symons provided the seed funding. The first signing to the label was Billy Bragg and early releases also came from Sheffield band The Box and Hull band The Housemartins. Records by the latter's spin-off group The Beautiful South were subsequently issued. Key staff contributors, following a move to Hammersmith, included comedian Phill Jupitus and Cathal Smyth (Madness' Chas Smash). Go! Beat Records was launched as a subsidiary for artists like Beats International, Gabrielle and Portishead. In 1992, Paul Weller signed for the main Go! Discs label.

In 1996, Macdonald resigned when PolyGram acquired a majority stake in the label, which folded not too long afterwards. However, Go! Discs' dance offshoot Go! Beat Records continued and became a unit in the PolyGram group. In 1999, Go! Discs was revived, but it is now in dormancy along with Go! Beat.

The Go! Discs catalogue now operates under EMI Records, a division of the Universal Music Group. It was rebranded from Virgin EMI Records in June 2020.

Andy Macdonald and Independiente
After the purchase of Go! Discs by PolyGram, Andy Macdonald started Independiente Records, and continued his involvement with the recording career of Paul Weller. Independiente is also the home of Travis, Roddy Frame, Embrace, Aaliyah, So Solid Crew, Howling Bells and Malian desert blues band Tinariwen.

Artists

 Anna
 Apollo Landing
 The Bathers
 The Bic
 The Beautiful South
 Billy Bragg
 The Blue Ox Babes
 Boothill Foot Tappers
 The Butterfield 8
 David Holmes
 Drugstore
 Father Father
 The Frank and Walters
 The Housemartins
 The La's
 Madness
 Paul Weller
 Portishead
 The Southernaires
 The Stairs
 Trashcan Sinatras

See also
 List of record labels

References

Go! Discs
Record labels established in 1983
Record labels disestablished in 1996
1983 establishments in the United Kingdom
Re-established companies
British independent record labels
Pop record labels
Rock record labels
Electronic music record labels